An oranda is a breed of goldfish. Oranda may also refer to:

 Oranda, Odisha, India
 Oranda, Virginia, United States
 Oranda Formation, a geologic formation in Virginia

See also
 Orenda, the Iroquois name for a spiritual energy inherent in people and their environment
 Orlanda (disambiguation)